North Carolina Highway 20 (NC 20) is a  North Carolina state highway that runs through Hoke, Robeson and Bladen counties. It serves as a major road in each of the three incorporated communities through which it passes. The route is co-designated as St. Pauls Road in Raeford, Main Street in Lumber Bridge, and Broad Street in St. Pauls.

Route description
The route then heads southeast as St. Pauls Drive, crossing over Peddlers Branch before exiting town. The route then passes through Dundarrach before exiting Hoke County. In Lumber Bridge, NC 20 continues as Main Street and intersects NC 71 and then continues southeast, passing by Rex.

The highway then interchanges I-95 and then intersects US 301 as it passes through St. Pauls as Broad Street. The route then enters Bladen County and reaches its eastern terminus at NC 87 north of Tar Heel.

History
After the introduction of U.S. highways in North Carolina in 1934, the route was carved up between routes US 19, US 70, US 74, US 76, and US 17.

The modern NC 20 was originally NC 220. Despite a few minor reroutings, the state highway has remained largely unchanged since the 1930s. The NC 220 designation was dropped permanently from the state highway system around 1935 after the introduction of US 220 into North Carolina. With the possible extension of I-20 into North Carolina, this route may be renumbered again.

Major intersections

References

External links

020
Transportation in Hoke County, North Carolina
Transportation in Robeson County, North Carolina
Transportation in Bladen County, North Carolina